Alejandro Alpízar Delgado (born 14 June 1979) is a Costa Rican professional football player who plays for C.S. Uruguay.

Due to his haircut, facial hair style and his skinny figure he was nicknamed El Mosquetero (The Musketeer), but is also known as Djorkaeff or El Matador.

Club career
He made his professional debut for Alajuelense on 9 May 1999 against Herediano, then was loaned to Universidad de Costa Rica and spent the whole season playing in the second division. The following season, he was loaned again to Municipal Pérez Zeledón, and then came back to Alajuelense for a few more seasons. He suffered an injury to his knee, so he missed the entire 2005-2006 season, and by the end of the season he decided to move on and signed for Deportivo Saprissa. He signed up for the current local champion and became his best acquisition for this season.

His first season with Deportivo Saprissa was very hard; he did not score too much, but ended up with 13 assists. Later, he became one of the most dangerous forwards in the region, helping his team to earn the local title twice, being the top scorer of his team. In the summer of 2009 he left them for Liberia Mía after Saprissa did not meet his salary demands.

In June 2012 he moved abroad to play in Guatemala for Hernán Medford's Xelajú, but did not return to them ahead of the 2013 Clausura because he was not allowed to leave Costa Rica. He then rejoined Alajuelense.

International career
Alpízar made his debut for Costa Rica in a February 2003 UNCAF Nations Cup match against Nicaragua and earned a total of 15 caps, scoring 3 goals. He has represented his country in 5 FIFA World Cup qualification matches and played at the 2003 and 2009 UNCAF Nations Cups.

His final international was a February 2009 UNCAF Nations Cup match against Panama. Alpízar also played for Costa Rica at the 2000 FIFA Futsal World Championship finals.

Career statistics

International goals
Scores and results list. Costa Rica's goal tally first.

References

External links
 
 Profile - Alajuelense

1979 births
Living people
Association football forwards
Costa Rican footballers
Costa Rica international footballers
L.D. Alajuelense footballers
C.F. Universidad de Costa Rica footballers
Municipal Pérez Zeledón footballers
Deportivo Saprissa players
Municipal Liberia footballers
Xelajú MC players
Liga FPD players
Costa Rican expatriate footballers
Expatriate footballers in Guatemala
2003 UNCAF Nations Cup players
2009 UNCAF Nations Cup players
Copa Centroamericana-winning players